Eben Christopher Upton   (born 5 April 1978) is the Welsh CEO of Raspberry Pi (Trading) Ltd., which runs the engineering and trading activities of the Raspberry Pi Foundation. He is responsible for the overall software and hardware architecture of the Raspberry Pi device. He is a former technical director and ASIC architect for Broadcom.

Life
Eben Upton was born in Griffithstown near Pontypool, Wales, where his mother is from; his father is language Prof Clive Upton. He lived in Lae in Papua New Guinea between the ages of eight weeks and two and a half years. He then returned to the UK to grow up in Leeds, Birmingham and Ilkley.

Upton completed a Bachelor of Arts degree in Physics and Engineering in 1999 at the University of Cambridge where he was an undergraduate student at St John's College, Cambridge. He went on to do the Cambridge Diploma in Computer Science graduating in 2001. After his diploma, Upton was a research student in the Computer Laboratory, University of Cambridge. After finishing his PhD degree, he earned an MBA at the Cambridge Judge Business School while working in industry.

Eben Upton moved production of Raspberry Pi computers from China to the Sony UK Technology Centre (Sony UK TEC) at Pencoed, Wales in 2012, 15–20 miles from where he was born.

Career
Before working at Broadcom, Upton was Director of Studies in Computer Science at St John's College, Cambridge, with responsibility for undergraduate admissions. During his academic career, he co-authored papers on mobile services, Human–computer interaction (HCI), bluetooth, data dependency graphs. and Fuel Panics: Insights From Spatial Agent-Based Simulation. . He has been a visiting Researcher at Intel Corporation, Founder and Chief Technology Officer at Ideaworks3D and a software engineer at IBM.

Works
Upton has published books including the Oxford Rhyming Dictionary with his father Clive Upton. With Gareth Halfacree he co-authored the Raspberry Pi User Guide. Upton has also co-authored Learning Computer Architecture with Raspberry Pi . with Jeffrey Duntemann, Ralph Roberts, Tim Mamtora and Ben Everard and Code the Classics - Volume 1. .

Awards and honours
Upton has won a number of awards including the Innovators Under 35 (TR35) from MIT Technology Review in 2012 and the Royal Academy of Engineering Silver Medal.

Upton was appointed Commander of the Order of the British Empire (CBE) in the 2016 Birthday Honours for services to business and education.

He was made a Fellow of the Royal Academy of Engineering (FREng) in 2017, and a Distinguished Fellow of the British Computer Society (DFBCS) in 2019.

In 2020, Upton was made an Honorary Fellow St John's College, Cambridge. In the same year, he was awarded the IEEE Masaru Ibuka Consumer Electronics Award and made an Honorary Fellow of the IET (HonFIET).

Personal life
Eben Upton is married to Raspberry Pi co-founder, Liz, whom he met at university. They have two children, a daughter, Aphra, and a son, Christopher (Kit).

References

External links
2020 IEEE Masaru Ibuka Consumer Electronics Award

1978 births
Living people
People from Pontypool
Alumni of St John's College, Cambridge
Members of the University of Cambridge Computer Laboratory
Intel people
IBM employees
Welsh computer scientists
Commanders of the Order of the British Empire
Fellows of the British Computer Society
Fellows of the Royal Academy of Engineering
Raspberry Pi